Red Blossoms is a 1940 Argentine comedy film directed by and written by Edmo Cominetti. The film starred Mecha Caus and Antuco Telesca.

Cast
Vicente Álvarez
Mecha Cobos
Justo Garaballo
Elisa Labardén
Mecha López
Juan José Piñeiro
Juan Siches de Alarcón
Enrique Vico Carré
Zully Moreno

Release
The film premiered in Argentina in October 1940.

References

External links

1940 films
1940s Spanish-language films
Argentine black-and-white films
1940 comedy films
Argentine comedy films
1940s Argentine films